"Starting Over Again" is a song written by Don Goodman and John Wesley Ryles, and recorded by American country music artist Steve Wariner.  It was released in August 1986 as the third single from the album Life's Highway.  The song reached #4 on the Billboard Hot Country Singles & Tracks chart.

The song should not be confused with the 1980 Dolly Parton hit "Starting Over Again".

Chart performance

References

1986 singles
1985 songs
Steve Wariner songs
Song recordings produced by Jimmy Bowen
Song recordings produced by Tony Brown (record producer)
MCA Records singles
Songs written by Don Goodman (songwriter)